Richard Gordon was an American actor in vaudeville and films and on stage and radio. He was perhaps best known for portraying the title role in the radio version of The Adventures of Sherlock Holmes.

Early years 
A native of Bridgeport, Connecticut, Gordon worked as a reporter on a newspaper there before he moved to New York City and became a reporter for the New York World. His earnings paid for his studies at Yale and the American Academy of Dramatic Arts.

Radio 
In addition to his work in The Adventures of Sherlock Holmes from 1931 to 1933, Gordon's roles on old-time radio included those shown in the table below:

Gordon also was heard on The Biblical Hour and in Shakespearean productions.

Stage and film 
After he turned down a producer's offer of $35 per week for a minor part in a play, Gordon spent 10 years with a theatrical touring company. Films in which Gordon appeared included Birth of a Baby, 13 Rue Madeleine, Saint Benny the Dip, and Things to Come.

Professional organizations 
Gordon was involved in founding the Actors' Equity Association. Not long after it was formed, however, he encountered conflicts with officers of the organization as he advocated for inclusion of actors from film and radio. Those efforts apparently led to his leaving the group's council after five years. As continued growth of radio led to the formation of another group to represent that medium's actors, Gordon served as an advisor to the new American Federation of Radio Artists.

Personal life 
Gordon was married to Emily Ann Wellman, an actress and playwright with whom he performed in vaudeville. To help her promote her works to producers, Gordon built a miniature theater using a scale of one-half inch to one foot. The couple prepared miniature props to enable creation of sets to help producers visualize the production of a play. Gordon, whom one newspaper reporter described as an "actor-carpenter", used his workshop, which was equipped with saws, drill press, planer, and lathe. He later married actress Rachel Crown. They had two children.

References 

20th-century American male actors
American male film actors
American male radio actors
American male stage actors
Male actors from Bridgeport, Connecticut